Dalip Singh Grewal (born 27 April 1899, died between 1971 and 1982) was an Indian track and field athlete who competed in the 1924 Summer Olympics and in the 1928 Summer Olympics.

Biography
He was born in Dolon Kalan, Punjab as Sikh and was the father of Balkrishan Singh. In 1924 he was eliminated in the qualification of the long jump competition and finished 14th overall. Four years later he finished 36th in the long jump event at the 1928 Olympics.

To the late Brigadier Dalip Singh goes the credit of being the first Sikh to represent India in the Olympics. The 1924 Olympic Games were held in Paris in which India sent a contingent of seven athletes. In this seven-man squad, two Sikhs, Dalip and Palam made their debut.
The Sikh had missed the bus only four years ago when six Indian athletes had participated in the 1920 Antwerp Olympics. Dalip Singh could not have made to the Paris Olympic Games but for the patronage and help coming in from the late Maharajadhiraj Bhupinder Singh of Patiala. It may be recalled that Dalip Singh besides being a fine athlete was a good hockey player also. When the trails were to be held at Lahore (now in Pakistan) for the Paris Olympics, Dalip Singh was scheduled to play for Patiala Tigers, a hockey team. It was here that the Maharaja of Patiala came to recognise his worth and helped him take a well-deserved place in the seven -man athletic team. It is true that the team then did not bring home any laurels, but it is on record that two among the Indian athletic performed really well, and one of them was Dalip Singh. In the long jump event, he narrowly missed a mark which could have earned him a place among the first six.

Another honour which went to Dalip Singh was that he was the first Indian, a Sikh, to be the torch-bearer at the inaugural Asian Games at Delhi in 1951.

Born at Dolon Kalan village district Ludhiana, Dalip Singh had his schooling in Mission School, that he joined Forman Christian College and Law College, Lahore. Even at School he showed potential of a good sportsman, nay all-rounder. In fact, he emerged as a fine athlete, showing great skill in 100,200,440 yards, 120 yards hurdles and long jump during the university days. He played hockey and cricket too.

But he got the real breakthrough when he was selected to represent India in the 1924 Paris Olympics. He was the captain of the Indian athletic team.

In fact, Dalip Singh can be described as a very distinguished man, In World War II, Dalip served the Patiala Infantry. He had joined the Patiala army in 1924. For his services, he was awarded M.B.E ( Medal for British Empire).

References

External links

profile
bio

1899 births
Year of death missing
Indian male long jumpers
Olympic athletes of India
Athletes (track and field) at the 1924 Summer Olympics
Athletes (track and field) at the 1928 Summer Olympics
Athletes from Punjab, India
20th-century Indian people